Chloroclystis naga is a moth in the family Geometridae. It was described by Prout in 1958. It is found in India (the Naga Hills).

References

External links

Moths described in 1958
naga